Four Mile Bridge ( /  / ) is a village spanning both sides of the Cymyran Strait in Wales, connecting Holy Island with Anglesey, and is approximately  southeast of Holyhead.

The village is quite small and is split between two communities on the two islands. The larger portion of the village is the principal settlement in the community of Rhoscolyn which recorded a population of 542 in the 2011 census. A small part of the village is in the community of Valley, Anglesey.

The village has a hairdressers and a pub named "The Anchorage".

Crossing

The bridge itself takes the same name as the village it is situated in and is one of three bridges connecting Holy Island and Anglesey. A bridge at this location was in existence by 1530, and was the only land route to Holyhead until the construction of the Stanley Embankment in 1823.

References

External links 
Photos of Four Mile Bridge and surrounding area on Geograph

Villages in Anglesey
Road bridges in Wales
Bridges in Anglesey
Valley, Anglesey
Rhoscolyn